S. Rajendran may refer to:
 S. Rajendran (AIADMK politician) (1956–2019), Indian politician and Member of Parliament elected from Viluppuram (Lok Sabha constituency) Tamil Nadu
 S. Rajendran, AIADMK politician and MLA in the period 2016-2021 from Ariyalur
 S. Rajendran (CPI politician) Indian politician and former Member of the Legislative Assembly of Tamil Nadu from Kovilpatti (state assembly constituency)
 S. Rajendran (CPI(M) politician), Indian politician and former Member of the Legislative Assembly of Kerala
 S. S. Rajendran, Indian actor, director, producer and politician
 S. N. Rajendran
 S. K. Rajendran